Małachowski (plural: Małachowscy, feminine form: Małachowska) was a Polish nobility family from Małachowice in central Poland, firstly mentioned in the 15th century.

History 
The progenitor of the family was Bartłomiej Małachowski (died 1433). The family owned a number of estates, among others: Nałęczów, Jurków, Brzeszcze, Dobra, Zadziele, Gruszowiec, Chyszowki, Łostówka, Wilczyce, Końskie, Lubomierz, Baranów Sandomierski, Radoszyce, Majkowice, Ćmielów, Borki, Borkowice, Grabowiec, Bodzechów, Nowe Miasto nad Pilicą, Opoczno, Ostróg, Piotrków Trybunalski, Włoszczowa, Białaczów, Ostrołęka, Grocholice, Bolencin, Niedźwiedź, and Rzeczniów.

Notable members 
 Jacek Małachowski
 Stanisław Małachowski
 Godzimir Małachowski

Coat of arms 
The family coat of arms was Nałęcz.

Residences

References